Mitchell Park Zoo is also known as Mitchell Park or Mitchell's Park. Situated in the Morningside suburb of Durban, South Africa, it is the only zoo in Durban.

The zoo was established as an Ostrich farm in 1910, but was unprofitable and started adding other animals. At one time it was home to many large animals, the most notable of which was an Indian Elephant named Nellie. Nellie was given to the zoo by the Maharajah of Mysore in 1928, and could blow a mouth organ and crack coconuts with her feet.

Today the Zoo holds various smaller animals such as blue duiker, small South American Monkeys, raccoons and various birds. The largest animals in the zoo today are Aldabra giant tortoises.

The zoo also includes a children's playground, a walk-through aviary, and the Blue Zoo tea garden, as well as a large lawn area for picnics. It is adjacent to Jameson Park, which was once a pineapple plantation and now displays some 200 species of roses.

Mammals 

 Suni
 Suricate
 Ground squirrel
 Banded mongoose
 White-eared marmosets
 Cotton-top tamarins
 Black-capped squirrel monkey
 Raccoons

Birds 

 Various species of parrots
 Black-shouldered and white Indian peafowls
 Grey crowned cranes
 Black swans
 Silver pheasants
 Nicobar pigeons
 Scarlet ibises
 Carolina wood ducks
 White imperial pigeons

Notes

External links 

 

Zoos in South Africa
Tourist attractions in Durban
Buildings and structures in Durban
1910 establishments in South Africa